Neotatea is a plant genus in the family Calophyllaceae. It is found in northwestern South America, primarily southern Colombia and Venezuela. There are four species currently recognized in the genus.

References

Calophyllaceae
Malpighiales genera